Nail art is a creative way to paint, decorate, enhance, and embellish nails. It is a type of artwork that can be done on fingernails and toenails, usually after manicures or pedicures. Manicures and pedicures are beauty treatments that trim, shape, and polish the nails. Often, these procedures remove the cuticles and soften the skin around the nails. Types of manicures can vary from polish on natural nails to dipping powder and acrylic nails.

History 

The exact origin of nail treatments is unclear, since it appears to have originated in different parts of the world around the same time. In ancient Egypt, from 5000 to 3000 BC, women would dye their nails with henna to indicate social status and seductiveness. Women of the lower class wore pastel and neutral shades, while the upper classes wore deep, bright shades. In Babylonia, 3200 BC, men, not women, painted their nails with black and green kohl, an ancient cosmetic. To prepare for war, warriors of Babylon spent hours having their nails prepared, hair curled, and other similar beauty treatments. As in ancient Egypt, nail color indicated one's status, black for noblemen and green for the common man. Around the same time, 3000 BC, the first nail polish originated in ancient China. It was made from beeswax, egg whites, gelatin, vegetable dyes, and gum arabic. Chinese dipped their nails in this mixture for several hours or left it on to dry. Colors ranged from pink to red, depending on the mixture of the ingredients. During the Zhou Dynasty, 600 BC, royalty used this simple nail polish with gold and silver dust on their nails to show their social status.

The Ming dynasty (1368-1644) was known for extremely long nails. Sometimes, these nails were protected by gold- and jewel-encrusted nail guards. Servants performed personal chores for the royals so their nails did not break or become damaged. Empress Dowager Cixi of China, who ruled from 1835 to 1908, was known for her outrageous nails. Many photos show the empress with 6-inch-long gold guards protecting her long nails. All of the aforementioned did not use nail art as it is widely known today, only stained, dyed, or dusted the fingernails and toenails. The first actual record of nail art was from the short-lived Inca Empire (1438-1533), which at that time was one of the largest empires in South America. Incas decorated their nails by painting eagles on them. In 1770, the first fancy gold and silver manicure sets were created. French King Louis XVI, who ruled from 1774 until his deposition in 1792, always had his nails taken care of using these sets.

In the early 1800s, the modern manicure developed with the invention of the orange stick, a thin wooden stick with one pointy end, usually made from orange wood. It was invented in 1830, by Dr. Sitts, a European podiatrist, who adapted a dental tool for manicure purposes. Previous to this invention, people used acid, a metal rod, and scissors to shape and trim the nails. In 1892, Dr. Sitts' niece invented a nail-care line for women of any social class, which eventually reached United States salons. Prior to then, women had short, almond-shaped nails and often used oils for additional shine or tint. Not long after, in 1907, the first liquid nail polish was invented, although it was colorless. Soon thereafter, it was available in variety of different colors. In 1925, the lunar manicure (today known as the half-moon manicure) was seen everywhere. Reds and pinks were used on the nail bed, while avoiding the area around the cuticles. Then again in 1970s, the natural look was back in fashion and preferred by many women, but only for a short time. The French manicure style was created in Paris in 1976 by Jeff Pink, who was the founder of the Los Angeles-based cosmetic company ORLY. Nail painting came back in vogue in the 1980s and since then has been extremely popular.

In popular culture 

The nail-care industry has been growing like never before ever since the invention of modern nail polish. In 2012, the United States witnessed a surging popularity of nail art. in the same year, a short nail-art documentary was released: "NAILgasm". The film explored the growing trend of nail art, from women across the world to high-fashion runways. Mostly women, but also men commonly use YouTube, Instagram, and Pinterest to learn how to do the newest and most interesting designs at home.

Social relevance 

In some cultures, nail art can be tied to the concept of femininity and the sense of belonging in a group of females.

Nail art is also a way to create its own identity through fashion, using colours and shapes as a disruption of childhood and entering to the female teen/adult world, also leaving the influence of their parents to create their own selves.
The nail is also part of the puzzle of mounting the gender identity, the nails for teenagers and adult women represents a piece of the symbol of what is a woman and how the woman should present herself. Though the women use nail art to express their womanliness, the different types of art define as a woman with particular personality, as using French manicure (delicate) or using black nails (aggressive).

Media 

Nail art’s popularity in media started with printed press with women magazines. It had an important role, but it was not a mainstream fashion trend before the 2000s. After the internet age and the common use of the social media, the trend became major subculture among women. Social media made it easier to connect to the mass audience, and with this, people started to share their designs as a way of their creativity and use the nail as their blank canvas. YouTube, Pinterest, Instagram, Tumblr, and Twitter are the major platforms, which provide many new ideas and designs for the subculture. However, among these, Pinterest is the most important platform for the new beauty trends according to a study.

Techniques and tools 
Manicurists start with the same techniques as for the manicure or pedicure:
 Acrylics: a chemical mixture of monomer liquid and polymer powder that can be directly applied on the nails or on artificial nails also called nails extensions or enhancements.
 Nail gel: a chemical combination similar to acrylics, also known as shellac nails. Manicurist applies several layers on the fingernails or/and toenails and lets it cure under a UV or LED light. When the gel is cured it hardens the nails. Gel is also common in a polish form known as gel polish, and, like other forms of gel, also requires a UV or LED light to cure. The difference between acrylic and gel is that acrylic dries naturally but gel needs UV light to cure. Similarly, where regular nail polish will dry naturally, gel polish will remain tacky until cured by a UV light.
 Nail polish/nail varnish: a lacquer applied to finger and toe nails to protect or as a base color. Nail manicurists also use a base coat to protect and strengthen nails, as well as preventing the natural nail from yellowing or staining.

Several options are available for decorating nails:
 Glitters
 Nail art pens
 Piercing
 Stamping
 Water Decals
 Water marbling
Adding accessories
 Studs, rhinestones, miniature plastic bow-ties, beads, dried flowers and aluminum foil
Acrylic powder for 3D art. The powder used for 3D acrylic nail art is a polymer powder which is used with a monomer liquid to create designs.

To decorate the nails, manicurists use several tools, such as:
Nail dotters, also known as "dotting tools"
 Nail art brushes
 Stationery tape/ stickers
 Thin, colored striping tape
Sponges (for gradient effects)

Do-it-yourself (DIY) is a new concept of doing nail art without the aid of experts or professionals. One of the ways of doing a DIY design is by using home tools such as  toothpicks, earbuds, cellophane tape, etc., or a tool set with dotted tools, brushes, and nail-art pens.

Innovations 

Some brands try to innovate by creating new kinds of nail polish.
 Textures: microbeads or caviar beads are applied just before the nail polish becomes dry. These textures give a sand-like texture to the nail.
 Holographic effect: Polishes with holographic finishes give off flashy rainbow reflections when exposed to light.

 Velvet manicure: Velvet fibers called velveteen are sprinkled onto wet polish. The excess is gently brushed off, leaving behind a fuzzy velvet feel.
 Crackle effect: Nail polish pioneer brand Sally Hansen created the first "crackle" effect polish. Acting as an overcoat, a crackle polish is applied onto already-painted nails and dries to a shattered or cracked effect.
 Thermochromic polish: The nail polish changes color when exposed to hot or cold temperatures.
 Matte effect: These nail polishes can transform a layer of glossy nail polish into a flat matte finish.
 Inverse French: Also called a "half-moon". The half-moon is created on the root of the nail in one color while the rest of the nail is painted a different color.
 Nail stickers: A form of artificial nails, there is a large range of nail stickers, strips and wraps on the market used to mimic nail polish.

Notable nail artists 

 Jenny Bui  
 Simply Nailogical

References

External links

Nail care
Nail polish
Handwear